Blanca Esperanza Lewin Gajardo (born August 7, 1974 in Santiago) is a Chilean actress of Jewish origin. She studied at Pontificia Universidad Católica de Chile. She is best known by her role of "Lola Padilla" in the soap opera Lola by Canal 13. She has won  awards including Altazor for "Best Actress" three times and Festival de Cine Internacional de Palm Springs.

Filmography

Film

Television

Theatre
 Edipo - 2003
 Roberto Zucco - 2006
 Desafección - 2006
 Las Tres Hermanas - 2008

References

External links
 

1974 births
Actresses from Santiago
Chilean film actresses
Chilean stage actresses
Chilean telenovela actresses
Chilean television actresses
Chilean television presenters
Living people
Pontifical Catholic University of Chile alumni
Chilean women television presenters
Chilean people of Jewish descent
Chilean television personalities